Jacinto Pereira (born December 10, 1974 in Luanda) is a retired Angolan football defender. He last played for ASA in the Girabola.

International career
Jacinto was on the 2006 African Cup of Nations squad for Angola.

National team statistics

References

External links

1974 births
Living people
Footballers from Luanda
Angolan footballers
Angola international footballers
2006 Africa Cup of Nations players
Atlético Sport Aviação players
Estrela Clube Primeiro de Maio players
Girabola players
Association football defenders